Aleksandr Perov (born 2 June 1955) is a Soviet former cyclist. He won a silver medal in the team pursuit event at the 1976 Summer Olympics.

References

1955 births
Living people
Soviet male cyclists
Cyclists at the 1976 Summer Olympics
Medalists at the 1976 Summer Olympics
Olympic cyclists of the Soviet Union
Olympic medalists in cycling
Olympic silver medalists for the Soviet Union
Sportspeople from Kaliningrad